Haykel Guemamdia (born 22 December 1981) is a Tunisian retired footballer who played as a forward.

Guemamdia had a spell with RC Strasbourg in France's Ligue 1.

Guemamdia is a member of the Tunisia squad for the 2006 FIFA World Cup, having been called up as a late replacement for the injured Mehdi Meriah.  As of 19 June 2006, Guemamdia has won 14 caps and scored 5 goals for his country, his first appearance coming against Malawi on 26 March 2006.

Honours

Club

Sfaxien
 Tunisian League: 2004–05
 Tunisian President Cup: 2003–04, 2008–09
Al-Ahli Jeddah
 Crown Prince Cup: 2006–07

References

External links
 
 
 
 
 

2005 FIFA Confederations Cup players
2006 FIFA World Cup players
2006 Africa Cup of Nations players
1981 births
Living people
Tunisian footballers
EGS Gafsa players
CS Sfaxien players
RC Strasbourg Alsace players
CSM Ceahlăul Piatra Neamț players
Tunisia international footballers
Expatriate footballers in Romania
Tunisian expatriate sportspeople in Romania
Expatriate footballers in France
Tunisian expatriate sportspeople in France
Expatriate footballers in Saudi Arabia
Tunisian expatriate sportspeople in Saudi Arabia
Ligue 1 players
Liga I players
Al-Ahli Saudi FC players
Tunisian Ligue Professionnelle 1 players
Association football forwards
Saudi Professional League players